is a Japanese actress. She won the award for Best Supporting Actress at the 6th Nikkan Sports Drama Grand Prix for Boku no Ikiru Michi.

Filmography

Films
 Pyrokinesis (2000)
 Tales of the Unusual (2000)
 Impossibility Defense (2018)
 My Blood & Bones in a Flowing Galaxy (2021)

Television
Aishiteiru to itte kure (1995)
Ring: The Final Chapter (1999)
Rasen (1999)
Friends (2002)
Boku no Ikiru Michi (2003)
Hotman (2003)
Shiroi Kyotō (2003–2004)
Yume de Aimashou (2005)
Top Caster (2006)

Dubbing
 Robots (Cappy)

References

External links
 

Living people
People from Kawasaki, Kanagawa
1978 births
Japanese film actresses
Japanese television actresses